My Life in the Bush of Ghosts is a novel by Nigerian writer Amos Tutuola, published in 1954.  It is presented as a collection of related – but not always sequential – narratives.

The stories recount the fate of a small West African boy. After he and his elder brother are abandoned by his family, they flee as armed slave traders approach their village.  On becoming separated from his brother, who has likely been captured by the slave traders, he unwittingly enters the bush, or wilderness.  He is too young and inexperienced to know, as every hunter and traveler does, that ghosts or spirits live there, and mortals risk great peril by entering the area.

The book is written in English from the viewpoint of the main character, the young boy, and describes his surreal experiences with strange beings in a strange place.  Tutuola's command of the language enabled him to modify his writing style to describe the external world and events in an authentic voice of youth and naivety.

The story is not one unbroken narrative, as other stories also appear out of sequence.

Many of the stories have the qualities of children's tales but with nightmarish or gruesome elements, similar to Grimms' Fairy Tales.

My Life in the Bush of Ghosts, like Tutuola's earlier The Palm-Wine Drinkard (1952), is heavily metaphorical and autobiographical.

Critical reception
Time magazine selected My Life in the Bush of Ghosts as one of its "100 Best Fantasy Books of All Time".

Tributes
The title of the 1981 album My Life in the Bush of Ghosts by David Byrne and Brian Eno was taken from this novel.

References

Scholarly articles

External links

1954 Nigerian novels
Nigerian English-language novels
Faber and Faber books
Nigerian fantasy novels